The 2016 FIBA U18 European Championship Division B was the 12th edition of the Division B of FIBA U18 European Championship. The competition took place in Skopje, Republic of Macedonia, from 29 July to 7 August 2016.

Participating teams
 
 

 
  (16th place, 2015 FIBA Europe Under-18 Championship Division A)

  (14th place, 2015 FIBA Europe Under-18 Championship Division A)

  (15th place, 2015 FIBA Europe Under-18 Championship Division A)

First round
In this round, the 24 teams are allocated in four groups of six teams each. The best two teams of each group will advance to the Quarterfinals.

Group A

Group B

Group C

Group D

Classification round

17th–24th place classification

17th–24th place quarterfinals

21st–24th place semifinals

23rd place game

21st place game

17th–20th place semifinals

19th place game

17th place game

9th–16th place classification

9th–16th place quarterfinals

13th–16th place semifinals

15th place game

13th place game

9th–12th place semifinals

Eleventh place game

Ninth place game

5th–8th place classification

5th–8th place semifinals

Seventh place game

Fifth place game

Final round

Quarterfinals

Semifinals

Third place game

Final

Final standings

References

External links
FIBA official website

FIBA U18 European Championship Division B
B
2016–17 in European basketball
2016–17 in Republic of Macedonia basketball
International youth basketball competitions hosted by North Macedonia
Sports competitions in Skopje
July 2016 sports events in Europe
August 2016 sports events in Europe
2010s in Skopje